Air Libya is a privately owned charter airline based in Benghazi, Libya. It was established in 1996 as Tibesti Air Libya,  and was initially based in Tripoli. The company now operates charter flights in support of oil field operations, as well as providing some scheduled and "ad hoc" charter services.  Its main base is at Benina International Airport in Benghazi.

Destinations

Current destinations
As of January 2021, Air Libya does not serve any scheduled destinations.

Terminated destinations
Agadez - Agadez Airport
Alexandria - Alexandria International Airport
Al-Fashir - El Fasher Airport
Benghazi - Benghazi Airport
Kufra - Kufra Airport
N'Djamena - N'Djamena Airport
Sabha - Sabha Airport
Tobruk - Tobruk Airport

Fleet

Current fleet
The Air Libya fleet consists of the following aircraft (as of August 2019):

Former fleet
The airline previously operated:
 1 Boeing 737-200
 1 Boeing 737-500 (as of August 2017)

References

External links 

Official website

Airlines of Libya
Airlines established in 1996
Libyan brands